Kaushik Gandhi (born 23 February 1990) is an Indian first-class cricketer. He made his List A debut for Tamil Nadu in the 2016–17 Vijay Hazare Trophy on 25 February 2017. He scored 124 off 134 ball against India B of a good bowling line up of Dhawal Kulkarni and Axar Patel.

See also
 List of Tamil Nadu cricketers

References

External links
 

1990 births
Living people
Indian cricketers
India Blue cricketers
Tamil Nadu cricketers